Amelanchier obovalis, the coastal serviceberry, coastal juneberry, or shadbush, is a species of flowering plant in the Rosaceae family. It is native to the Atlantic coastal plain of the United States, from New Jersey to Georgia, typically in pine barrens and other dry woodlands.

References

External links
 

obovalis
Endemic flora of the United States
Flora of Delaware
Flora of Georgia (U.S. state)
Flora of Maryland
Flora of New Jersey
Flora of North Carolina
Flora of Pennsylvania
Flora of South Carolina
Flora of Virginia
Plants described in 1903